Alexei Perry Cox is a Canadian writer and musician.

Overview
Perry Cox is a musician and poet. Under Her is her first collection of poetry, coming out with Insomniac Press. It was largely written in Lebanon.

Published Writing

Videography

Art Design and Layout

Discography

Handsome Furs
 Plague Park (2007) Sub Pop
 Face Control (2009) Sub Pop
 Sound Kapital (2011) Sub Pop

Award Nominations

References

http://www.thebeijinger.com/blog/2010/04/29/Alexei-Perry-Cox-in-Conversation-with-Jamie-Stewart-of-Xiu-Xiu

External links
 Sub Pop: Handsome Furs
 Under Her

Living people
Canadian women rock singers
Canadian indie rock musicians
Year of birth missing (living people)
Place of birth missing (living people)